Michael G. Ellis (February 21, 1941July 20, 2018) was an American Republican politician. He served 44 years in the Wisconsin Legislature, including 12 years in the Wisconsin State Assembly (1971–1983) and 32 years in the Wisconsin State Senate (1983–2015), and was President of the Wisconsin Senate for the 101st Wisconsin Legislature and most of the 100th.

Biography
Ellis, a native of Neenah, Wisconsin, attended Neenah High School and earned a B.S. in secondary education at the University of Wisconsin–Oshkosh (1965). He served in the State Senate from 1982 to 2015 and represented the 19th District from 1998 to 2015.

He was President of the Senate two times between 2011 and 2015. He was previously a member of the Wisconsin State Assembly from 1970 through 1980. Ellis also served on the Neenah Common Council from 1969 until 1975.

In April 2014, Ellis announced he would not run for re-election in 2014, two days after the release of a video where Ellis was shown "discussing the creation of an illegal political action committee to attack his [Democratic] challenger".

Death
Ellis died at his home in Neenah on July 20, 2018, aged 77.

References

External links
Senator Michael Ellis at the Wisconsin State Legislature
 
19th Senate District, Senator Ellis in the Wisconsin Blue Book (2005–2006)

1941 births
2018 deaths
20th-century American politicians
21st-century American politicians
Republican Party members of the Wisconsin State Assembly
Politicians from Neenah, Wisconsin
Presidents of the Wisconsin Senate
Republican Party Wisconsin state senators
University of Wisconsin–Oshkosh alumni
Wisconsin city council members